A list of films produced by the Ollywood film industry based in Bhubaneshwar and Cuttack in 1972:

A-Z

References

1972
Ollywood
Films, Ollywood
1970s in Orissa